Wailuku Elementary School is a public elementary school operated by the Hawaii Department of Education, occupying a historic school building in Wailuku, Hawaii.

At the time Wailuku School was dedicated in May 1904 (as Wailuku Public School, renamed Wailuku Elementary School in 1928), it was described as "the handsomest school building on the island or perhaps the country." Designed by one of the Territory of Hawaii's most prominent architects, C.W. Dickey (then in partnership with E.A.P. Newcomb), it remains the only stone school building in Maui. It was added to the National Register of Historic Places on 30 June 2000.

On 21 May 1904 Territorial Senator Henry Perrine Baldwin laid the cornerstone and buried a cast iron time capsule containing an 1866 copy of the Daily Hawaiian Herald (whose most famous reporter was Mark Twain) and other publications from the era, along with an assortment of U.S. and Hawaiian coins and postage stamps. The time capsule was unearthed on 21 April 2004.

The royal palms that line the driveway were planted on Arbor Day in 1905, the old wooden schoolhouse was torn down in 1907, and new classrooms of concrete block were added in 1951. During World War II, the U.S. Army commandeered the building, forcing classes to be held in nearby churches and community buildings.

Gallery

References

External links
 
 Wailuku Elementary School

School buildings on the National Register of Historic Places in Hawaii
School buildings completed in 1904
Public elementary schools in Hawaii
Public schools in Maui
National Register of Historic Places in Maui County, Hawaii
1904 establishments in Hawaii
Educational institutions established in 1904
Hawaii Register of Historic Places